The Canadian Federation for the Humanities and Social Sciences, also known as the Federation for the Humanities and Social Sciences, is a member-based organization and the national voice for researchers in the humanities and social sciences in Canada. Formed in 1996 through a merger of the Social Science Federation of Canada and the Canadian Federation for the Humanities, it is a non-profit charitable organization that represents more than 85,000 researchers in 81 scholarly associations, 80 universities and colleges, and 6 affiliates across the country.

Purpose

Through its activities, the federation strives to support and advance Canada's research in the humanities and social sciences, which are important for social, cultural and economic understanding and addressing the most pressing public policy issues of today.

Research in the humanities and social sciences allows innovation in all areas to flourish. A better understanding of social, cultural and political issues ensures more effective technological innovation, medical discovery and economic growth.

The federation:
 represents and convenes one of the biggest research communities in Canada;
 hosts the biggest multidisciplinary gathering of scholars in North America;
 supports the publication of 150 scholarly books per year;
 awards scholarly book prizes each year;
 runs a series of lectures on Parliament Hill to bring humanities and social science research to policy makers;
 addresses professional matters, including equity issues;
 undertakes research projects to help advance Canada's humanities and social science fields.

The federation is a non-profit, charitable organization, governed by an executive committee and board of directors made up of scholars from its member groups with a permanent secretariat based in Ottawa, Ontario, Canada.

The federation's work is sustained by membership fees, revenue from its annual Congress of the Humanities and Social Sciences, project funding from the Social Sciences and Humanities Research Council and other government bodies, and through the support of colleagues, institutional donors and other individuals through the Canadian Endowment for the Humanities and Social Sciences.

Congress of the Humanities and Social Sciences 

Originally established in 1930 as the Learned Societies Conference, and later renamed the Congress of the Humanities and Social Sciences in 1996, this congress is the largest annual academic gathering in Canada and its multidisciplinary character marks it as unique in the world. Since its beginning, it has been an important meeting place for new and established academics and researchers working in such diverse areas as anthropology, bibliotherapy, communication and disability studies, English language and literature, French language and literature, geography, the history and philosophy of science, international development, Jacques Maritain studies, political science, social work, theatre research, Ukrainian studies, women's studies and many more. Congress is currently organized by the Federation for the Humanities and Social Sciences.

In 2014, from May 24 to May 31, approximately 8,000+ attendees representing 75 scholarly associations gathered at Brock University in St. Catharines, Ontario, Canada, from all over North America, Europe, Africa, and Asia to present their research and to debate some of the most important social and cultural questions of the day.

Upcoming locations:
 University of Western Ontario, London, Ontario, May 30 to June 5, 2020

Big Thinking 

Formerly known as Breakfast on the Hill, the federation's Big Thinking lecture series lets leading researchers offer fresh ideas to Canada's parliamentarians. Perhaps more than any other program or lecture series, this one demonstrates the critical link between publicly funded research and policy development.

Launched in 1994, the Big Thinking series has featured more than 50 humanists and social scientists presenting their findings to thousands of key members in the Ottawa policy community. Held up to six times a year on Parliament Hill, Big Thinking lectures are delivered when the House and Senate are in session. The talks are high-profile opportunities to introduce evidence from current research on the most pressing public policy issues

Awards to Scholarly Publications Program 

The Awards to Scholarly Publications Program (ASPP) is a key activity of the Federation for the Humanities and Social Sciences. Formerly known as the Aid to Scholarly Publications Program, the ASPP is a competitive funding program designed to assist with the publication of scholarly books on topics in the humanities and social sciences.

Through this program, the federation tangibly supports research dissemination and encourages excellence in humanities and social science scholarship.

Under the program's mandate to support books of advanced scholarship in the humanities and social sciences that make an important contribution to knowledge, the ASPP has supported the publication of over 6,000 books that have helped to enrich the social, cultural and intellectual life of Canada and the world.

Each year, the ASPP offers 180 Publication Grants of $8,000 and five Translation Grants of $12,000, contributing 1.5 million dollars to the dissemination of Canadian research.

The federation gratefully acknowledges the funding of the Social Sciences and Humanities Research Council.

Canada Prizes 

The Canada Prizes are awarded annually to the best scholarly books in the humanities and social sciences that have received funding from the ASPP. The Canada Prizes are awarded to books that make an exceptional contribution to scholarship, are engagingly written, and enrich the social, cultural and intellectual life of Canada. Each winner receives $2,500.

In 2014, the Canada Prizes were awarded to the following books:
 Canada Prize in the Humanities (English): Sandra Djwa, Journey With No Maps: A Life of P.K. Page, published by McGill-Queen's University Press
 Canada Prize in the Humanities (French): Pierre Anctil, Jacob-Isaac Segal, 1896–1954 : Un poète yiddish de Montréal et son milieu, published by Presses de l'Université Laval
 Canada Prize in the Social Sciences (English): David E. Smith, Across the Aisle: Opposition in Canadian Politics, published by University of Toronto Press
 Canada Prize in the Social Sciences (French): Hugues Théorêt, Les chemises bleues : Adrien Arcand, journaliste antisémite canadien-français, published by Éditions du Septentrion

Presidents

 1996–1998 Chad Gaffield
 1998–2000 Louise Forsyth
 2000–2002 Patricia Clements
 2002–2004 Doug Owram
 2004–2006 Don Fisher
 2006–2008 Noreen Golfman
 2008–2009 Nathalie Des Rosiers
 2009–2011 Noreen Golfman
 2011–2013 Graham Carr
 2013–2015 Antonia Maioni
 2015–2017 Stephen Toope
 2017–2019 Guy Laforest
 2019–present Patrizia Albanese

Executive Directors

 1996–1998 Marcel Lauzière
 1998–2001 Louise Robert
 2001–2006 Paul Ledwell
 2006–2009 Jody Ciufo 
 2009–2016 Jean-Marc Mangin
 2016–2017 Christine Tausig Ford (interim)
 2017–present Gabriel Miller

References

External links
 

Learned societies of Canada
Supraorganizations